Bangaru Bullodu may refer to:

 Bangaru Bullodu (1993 film)
 Bangaru Bullodu (2021 film)